Bangkok Declaration may refer to:
The 1967 ASEAN Declaration
The 1993 Bangkok Declaration on human rights